Aage Poulsen (16 July 1919 – 31 August 1998) was a Danish long-distance runner. Between 1941 and 1951, Poulsen won ten medals at the Danish national championships, across multiple distances, including three golds. He competed in the men's 5000 metres at the 1948 Summer Olympics.

References

External links
 

1919 births
1998 deaths
Athletes (track and field) at the 1948 Summer Olympics
Danish male long-distance runners
Olympic athletes of Denmark
Place of birth missing